Fasciculus vesanus is an extinct species of stem-group ctenophores known from the Burgess Shale of British Columbia, Canada.

The species is remarkable for its two sets of long and short comb rows, not seen in similar form elsewhere in the fossil record or among modern species.

See also
Ctenorhabdotus capulus
Xanioascus canadensis

Maotianshan shales ctenophores
Maotianoascus octonarius
Sinoascus paillatus
Stromatoveris psygmoglena

References

External links

Prehistoric ctenophore genera
Burgess Shale animals
Monotypic ctenophore genera
Fossil taxa described in 1978
Cambrian genus extinctions